The Glidersport LightHawk is an American mid-wing, T-tailed, single-seat, microlift glider under development by Glidersport.

Design and development
The LightHawk is made from composites. The construction gives a very low empty weight of just .

The aircraft first flew in 2002 and certification was initially forecast for 2011, and then for late 2012, but had not been completed as of December 2015.

Specifications (LightHawk)

See also

References

External links

2000s United States sailplanes
Aircraft first flown in 2002
T-tail aircraft
Mid-wing aircraft